Arlington International Racecourse (formerly Arlington Park, the name was Arlington Park Jockey Club from as early as 1948 until 1955) was a horse race track in the Chicago suburb of Arlington Heights, Illinois. Horse racing in the Chicago region had been a popular sport since the early days of the city in the 1830s, and at one time Chicago had more horse racing tracks (six) than any other major metropolitan area. Arlington International was the site of the first thoroughbred race with a million-dollar purse in 1981. It was located near the Illinois Route 53 expressway. It was serviced by the Chicago and Northwestern Railroad. The premier event at Arlington Park was the International Festival of Racing, held in early August, which featured three Grade 1 races on turf: the Arlington Million Stakes, Beverly D. Stakes and Secretariat Stakes. Owner Churchill Downs Inc. announced plans in February 2021 to sell all 326 acres of Arlington Park property for redevelopment.  On September 29, 2021, the Chicago Bears announced that they reached an agreement to purchase the property. The sale was finalized in February of 2023.

History
Arlington International Racecourse was founded as Arlington Park by California businessman Harry D. "Curly" Brown who would later serve as president of Oriental Park Racetrack in Havana, Cuba. The track officially opened in 1927 to 20,000 spectators. Jockey Joe Bollero, who later became a successful trainer, rode Luxembourg to victory in the first race ever run at Arlington.

Benjamin F. Lindheimer acquired control of Arlington Park in 1940 and owned it until his death in 1960. Long involved with the business, adopted daughter Marje Lindheimer Everett then took over management of the racetrack. Widely respected Hall of Fame trainer Jimmy Jones of Calumet Farms was quoted by Sports Illustrated as saying that Lindheimer "was the savior of Chicago racing" and that "Arlington Park became the finest track in the world—certainly the finest I've ever been on."

On July 5, 1948, Citation won the Stars and Stripes Stakes in his first appearance since winning the Triple Crown. He equalled the track record at the time by winning in 1:49 1/5.

On June 24, 1952, jockey Eddie Arcaro becomes the first American jockey to win 3,000 races.

After 1955, seating capacity was increased to 30,000 and parking facilities expanded to accommodate 15,000.

In 1960 a new paddock was unveiled.

In 1964, Arlington Park inherits the thoroughbred race dates of Washington Park, who is now exclusively running harness races.

In 1966, future Hall of Fame jockey Laffit Pincay Jr. gets his first American victory.

In 1968, the future Hall of Famer Dr. Fager wins the one-mile Washington Park Handicap in world record time of 1:32 1/5. He carried 143 pounds and held that record until 1998.

In 1968, Marje Everett sold the racetrack to Gulf & Western, remaining as director. In 1969, she was accused of bribing Illinois Governor Otto Kerner Jr. The alleged bribes were in the form of stock options in 1961 that Kerner bought at a reduced price and then sold in 1968 at a profit. Kerner was eventually convicted of mail fraud, but Everett denied at trial that she intended to bribe him, and the government never identified her as a briber.

In June 1973, Arlington organized a race for three-year-olds, the Arlington Invitational, to lure Secretariat to the mid-west. Secretariat won easily and Arlington created the Secretariat Stakes, also for three-year-olds but on the turf, in his honor.

In 1981 under the direction of track president Joseph Joyce Jr., Arlington was the home of the world's first million-dollar thoroughbred race: The Arlington Million. The result of that race is noted in bronze at the top of the paddock at Arlington, where a statue of jockey Bill Shoemaker riding John Henry to a come-from-behind victory over 40–1 longshot The Bart celebrates Thoroughbred racing's inaugural million-dollar race.

Arlington entered a new era in 1983 when Richard L. Duchossois led an Illinois investment group to purchase the track from its former owners and made a pledge to continue presenting championship racing. That was tested on July 31, 1985, when a small fire spread quickly out of control and completely destroyed the grandstand and clubhouse. Unsure of the future of Arlington, the meet was moved to Hawthorne Race Course. Yet it was announced that the Arlington Million would still be held at Arlington International.  On August 25, 1985, they did just that by using temporary bleachers. Joyce resigned in 1986 after disagreements with Duchossois. The track fully reopened in 1989 under a new name, Arlington International Racecourse.

In 1996, 34,000 fans jammed into Arlington to see the two-time Horse of the Year and future Hall of Famer Cigar tie the modern day record of 16 consecutive wins in the Arlington Citation Challenge.

Due to contract disputes, Arlington had no racing in 1998 and 1999.

In 2000, Arlington reopened after a two-year shutdown. In September of that year, Churchill Downs Incorporated completed its purchase of the track. In 2001, Arlington reopened as Arlington Park but returned to Arlington International Racecourse in 2013.

Arlington hosted the 2002 Breeders' Cup World Thoroughbred Championships at their track.

In 2007 to promote safer racing, Arlington International Racecourse invested $11 million to install a synthetic racing surface called Polytrack which is still used today. Do the Wave won the first race on the Polytrack on May 4. On May 11, Arlington debuts an alternate finish line at the 1/16 pole.

In 2016, Arlington debuted the Arlington Racing Club, an ownership group with the goal to garner interest in thoroughbred ownership.

Reality television 
On May 14, 2010, Lee DeWyze, a citizen of Mount Prospect, Illinois, and a contestant on American Idol, performed a concert at Arlington Park for approximately 41,000 fans. Also on May 14, Arlington is featured in an episode of Undercover Boss where Churchill Downs Inc. CEO Bill Carstanjen goes to Arlington and Calder Race Course.

A year later, on May 14, 2011, Haley Reinhart, of Wheeling, Illinois, also made the top 3 on American Idol. She, like DeWyze, had a hometown concert at the track for nearly 30,000 of her own fans and supporters.

Pioneers in racing 

Arlington was the first track to install a public-address system and employed the pioneering race caller Clem McCarthy to describe the action. It added the first electric totalizator which allowed a credible tote board and decreased time between races, in 1933. In 1936 it added a photo finish camera. It introduced the first electric starting gate in 1940 and the largest closed-circuit TV system in all of sports in 1967. In 1971, Arlington held the industry's first commercially sponsored race—the $100,000 Pontiac Grand Prix. On July 4, 1976, Arlington hosted the first races on a Sunday in Illinois.

While Arlington is credited in some circles with the introduction of trifecta wagering in 1971, the New York Racing Association first offered the bet a year earlier as "The Triple".

Planned redevelopment 
In August 2019, track owner Churchill Downs Inc. (CDI) announced that it would consider options to transfer racing away from Arlington Park after 2021. The announcement stemmed from the enactment of the Illinois Gaming Act, which provided for the legalization of sports betting and the construction of new casinos in Illinois. The law gave CDI the right to install up to 1,200 gaming positions, such as slot machines, at Arlington Park. However, CDI – which had acquired a majority stake of Rivers Casino in nearby Des Plaines earlier that year and had already announced plans to expand it – argued that the installation of gaming positions at Arlington would result in higher tax payments of up to 20% compared to nearby casinos because of contributions needed to fund horse racing purses.

In February 2021, CDI announced plans to sell the entire Arlington Park property for redevelopment. CDI said it would also seek the transfer of Arlington's racing license to another track in the state, but committed to Arlington's race dates for 2021 (April 30 – September 25). In response, the Illinois Thoroughbred Horsemen's Association (which represents thoroughbred owners and trainers at both Arlington and Hawthorne) denounced CDI's decision, alleging that CDI "all but abandoned any meaningful commitment to Illinois racing" after their majority acquisition of Rivers Casino.

In June 2021, the Chicago Bears announced they had submitted a bid to purchase the land for a potential new stadium to replace their longtime home of Soldier Field (where they have played since 1971). Later in June 2021, the Village of Arlington Heights formally approved overlay zoning district for a large-scale football stadium at the site.

The last race was held on September 25, 2021 with a 9 race event. The winner of the final race held at Arlington (which was named "The Luxembourg" after the winner of the first race at the track), was Sister Ruler. The final day was capped off with a showing of a documentary on the fire at the track and a fireworks show.

On September 29, 2021 the Chicago Bears announced they would purchase the property for $197.2 million. If a stadium is approved and built, it would be the second horse racing course to be replaced with an NFL venue in recent years, as Inglewood, California's Hollywood Park (once owned by CDI) was replaced by SoFi Stadium, the home of the Los Angeles Chargers and Los Angeles Rams.  On October 27, 2021 the Bears confirmed that they are not pursuing horse racing but had no further details on their plans for the property.

On March 16, 2022, the Chicago Bears announced that they have selected MANICA Architecture to help plan the new NFL stadium.

The Chicago Bears completed the purchase in February of 2023.

Physical attributes

The track had a one-mile and one-eighth dirt oval and a one-mile turf oval. There was stabling on the backstretch for over 2,000 horses.

Arlington replaced its dirt course with a synthetic track prior to the opening of the 2007 season.

TV personalities
Tony Cobitz (1990–91)
Caton Bredar (1988–1991)
Lynne Snierson (1992–1994)
Christine Gabriel (1995–1997, 2000–2005)
John G. Dooley (2000–2021)
Molly Ryan (2006)
Liane Davis (2006–2007)
Zoe Cadman (2006–2007)
Lauren Massarella (2006–2008)
Joe Kristufek  (2006–2018)
Jessica Pacheco (2008–2013)
Alyssa Ali (2007–2021)
Gabby Gaudet (2014–2015)
Dan Potter (2001–2018)
Brian Spencer (2015–2017)
Noel Michaels (2018–2019)

Racing

Arlington's live racing season formerly ran from the first Friday in May to the second to last Saturday in September. Since 2001 (up until its final season of 2021) races at Arlington had been announced by John G. Dooley.

The following stakes were held at Arlington in 2019.

Grade I 
 Arlington Million
 Beverly D. Stakes
 Secretariat Stakes

Grade III 
 American Derby
 Arlington Handicap
 Arlington Classic Stakes
 Arlington Matron Stakes
 Chicago Handicap
 Hanshin Cup Stakes
 Modesty Handicap
 Pucker Up Stakes

Listed
 Addison Cammack Memorial
 Arlington-Washington Futurity Stakes
 Arlington-Washington Lassie Stakes
 Hatoof Stakes
 Isaac Murphy Handicap

Former Races

 American 1000 Guineas Stakes
 Arlington Oaks
 Arlington Sprint Handicap
 Lincoln Heritage Handicap
 Round Table Stakes 
 Sea o'Erin Stakes
 Stars and Stripes Turf Handicap
 Washington Park Handicap

References

External links

Arlington International website
Arlington International entertainment

 
Arlington Heights, Illinois
Eclipse Award winners
Defunct horse racing venues in Illinois
Sports venues in Cook County, Illinois
Churchill Downs Incorporated
1927 establishments in Illinois
2021 disestablishments in Illinois
Sports venues completed in 1927